The Tribe, formerly the World Wide Message Tribe (WWMT), were a British Christian dance band. Their aim was "to communicate the gospel to young people in Greater Manchester". They were part of the Christian charity, The Message Trust in Manchester.

Background
The World Wide Message Tribe formed in 1991, and grew out of an evangelistic project called "Message to Schools" run by fashion designer Andy Hawthorne and singer Mark Pennells. The Tribe disbanded in 2004.

The line up of the Tribe varied over the 13 years and included many recognised Christian artists including Andy Hawthorne (director of the message), Mark Pennells (co-director of Innervation trust), Zarc Porter (also co-director of Innervation Trust as well as producer and co-writer for most of the Tribe's musical output), Elaine Hanley, Lorraine Williams, Sani, Beth Redman (internationally known artist and author and wife of Matt Redman; she was later in a band called Storm which released an eponymous album in 1998.), Cameron Danté (formerly of Bizarre Inc), Deronda K Lewis, Colette Smethurst, Claire Prosser, Emma and Tim Owen, Lindz West, Jorge Mhondera and Quintin Delport (Jorge and Quintin were formally members of SA band, M.I.C. and have now set up a new bands known as Whistlejacket and Shackleton respectively).

The Tribe's parent organisation, The Message Trust, has since created three bands, BlushUK (a girl group), LZ7, a hip hop group fronted by ex-Tribe member Lindz West, and Twelve24, another hip hop group. "Genetik", the tribe academy has been set up with the vision to train up young evangelists in an Urban or Creative course at its Manchester base. Mark Pennells and Zarc Porter have also continued to develop evangelistic bands and projects as part of the Innervation Trust including Shinemk, V*enna, thebandwithnoname, tbc, BeBe Vox, iSingPOP and iSingWorship.

The group won three GMA Dove Awards.

Discography
 WWMT – Take A Long Hike With The Chosen Few (N*Soul/Diamante, 1993) – N*Soul's first CD
 WWMT – Dance Planet (N*Soul/Diamante, 1995) – Compilation, #1 radio hits
 WWMT – Jumping in the House of God (Warner Alliance, 1995)
 WWMT – We Don't Get What We Deserve (Warner Alliance, 1995)
 Jumping in the House of God II (Alliance, 1996) – Various artists
 WWMT – Revived (Warner Alliance, 1996) – Compilation
 WWMT – Heatseeker (Warner Resound, 1997)
 Jumping in the House of God III (Alliance, 1998) – Various artists
 WWMT – Frantik (Resolve/Diamante, 1999)
 The Tribe – Take Back The Beat (Alliance, 2001) – Three track/video cd-rom
 The Tribe – Raise Your Game (Authentic, 2003)
 The Tribe – Message to the Masses (2004) – Compilation

Singles

References
 Andy Hawthorne, Diary of a Dangerous Vision, Kingsway Books, 15 April 2004,

Notes

External links
 
 CrossRhythms articles
 Interview with Andy Hawthorne of The World Wide Message Tribe (May 1998)
 Page on N*Soul Records
 Christian Music Artist Database entry
 The music behind the Tribe and others

English Christian musical groups
British performers of Christian hip hop music
Performers of Christian electronic dance music
Christian hip hop groups
English dance music groups
Musical groups established in 1991
1991 establishments in the United Kingdom
Musical groups from Manchester